The South Iowa Cedar League is a high school athletic conference in south central and southeastern Iowa. The conference is made up of mostly 1A schools, as well as a few 2A schools (the two smallest classes in the state).

A 9-team league from the 1960s, the conference expanded to 12 teams in 1996, then dropped to 11 members when Williamsburg joined the Eastern Iowa Hawkeye Conference in 2000. In the fall of 2014, the schools of the SICL voted to allow Colfax–Mingo to join the SICL, making it a 12-team league again.

Members

East Division

West Division

Sports
Boys' sports are administered through the Iowa High School Athletic Association, and girls' sports are administered through the Iowa Girls High School Athletic Union.
Sports classes for each are based on enrollment.

Football is played by districts based on their enrollment classification and geography, instead of by conference. Most SICL schools are in Class A, the smallest of five classifications for the 11-man football game, although Sigourney-Keota -- which has had a cooperative agreement since 1987 -- is Class 1A.  As of 2019, four SICL schools -- Iowa Valley, English Valleys, HLV and Tri-County -- play eight-man football.

The conference offers the following sports:

 Fall — volleyball, boys' cross-country and girls' cross-country.
 Winter — Boys' basketball, girls' basketball and boys' wrestling and girls' wrestling.
 Spring — Boys' track and field, girls' track and field, boys' golf and girls' golf.
 Summer — Baseball and softball.

Although the member schools field junior varsity teams (for freshman and sophomore athletes) in many of the above-mentioned sports, conference championships are determined at varsity level only. Also, not all schools field teams in every sport, while others are part of cooperative sharing agreements with schools within and outside the SICL.

State championships

Membership timeline

External links
 South Iowa Cedar League Roster

References

High school sports in Iowa